WBTV is a CBS television affiliate in Charlotte, North Carolina.

WBTV may also refer to:

 The WB Television Network, a defunct television network in the United States
 WBTV: The Warner Channel UK, an unrealised satellite channel in the United Kingdom
 Warner TV, a cable and satellite channel that also goes by "WBTV"
 Warner Bros. Television, a television production and distribution company
 WBTV-LP, a low-power radio station (99.3 FM) licensed to serve Burlington, Vermont, United States